Destined may refer to:

 Destiny
 Destined (Cast novel), 2011 novel in the House of Night series by P.C. Cast and Kristin Cast
 Destined (Pike novel), 2012 novel in the Wings series by Aprilynne Pike
 Destined (film), 2016 American fantasy drama film
 "Destined" (Ms. Marvel), a 2022 episode of the American television series Ms. Marvel
 Destined Records, a British independent record label

See also
 Destiny (disambiguation)